Irina Kokoueva (born 24 June 1973) is a Belarusian biathlete. She competed in three events at the 1994 Winter Olympics.

References

1973 births
Living people
Biathletes at the 1994 Winter Olympics
Belarusian female biathletes
Olympic biathletes of Belarus
Place of birth missing (living people)